Cryphioxena notosema is a moth of the family Elachistidae. It was described in 1922 by Edward Meyrick. Some authors place the genus Cryphioxena, including this species, in family Bucculatricidae instead. It is found in Australia.

References

External links
 Australian Faunal Directory

Elachistidae
Moths described in 1922
Taxa named by Edward Meyrick
Moths of Australia